Göhl is a municipality in the district of Ostholstein, in Schleswig-Holstein, Germany.

Geography 
Göhl lies around three kilometers east of Oldenburg on the Wagrian peninsular. The southern border of Göhl runs along the Oldenburger Graben through the marshy lands of the former Gruber sea. The Lübeck–Puttgarden railway runs through the municipality but does not stop for passenger transport.

The municipality consists of the settlements Antoinettenhof, Christianstal, Gaarz, Gaarzerfelde, Gaarzermühle, Göhl, Giebelberg, Kremsdorf, Lütjendorf, Neuschwelbek, Plügge, Quals und Schwelbek.

A commercial area of 2.5 ha was created in the north of the settlement of Göhl in 1995.

History 
Göhl was first mentioned in 1317, at the time under the name "Gola", a Slavic word meaning "heather".

Since the start of the 15th century, what is today Göhl has been part of Gut Schwelbek zu Putlos. In 1910, the Gutsbezirk Schwelbek was transformed into the municipality of Goel to wich the Gutsbezirk Kremsdorf and the municipality of Plügge were subsequently added in 1928 and 1939 respectively. The spelling of Goel was standardized to "Göhl" in 1937.

Demographics 

As of December 31 2021, Göhl has a population of 1,118 with 560 (50.1%) being male, and 558 (49.9%) being female. The median age was 45.4 as of 2021.

Göhl had the highest percentage of under 18 years olds at 24% (293) in Ostholstein as of 2003. This population has since shrunken to 17.3% (193) in 2021 however.

Citizenship 
In the 2011 census, 1,156 people (98.4%) in Göhl possessed only German citizenship, 7 people (0.6%) possessed Polish citizenship, and 3 people (0,3%) possessed Dutch, Austrian, and Russian citizenship respectively.

Religion 
In the 2011 census, 789 people (67.1%) were members of the Evangelical Church in Germany, with 38 (3.2%) belonging to the Catholic church, and 348 (29.6%) being either irreligious or belonging to another confession.

The only church in the municipality is the evangelical-lutheran Marco chapel (Marco-Kapelle) opposite of the kindergarten in the village of Göhl.

Politics 
The current mayor of Göhl is Thomas Bauer (BGG), he was reelected in the 2018 Schleswig-Holstein municipal elections.
! colspan=2| Candidate
! Party
! Votes
! %
! +/-
! Seats
! +/-
|-
| bgcolor=#63B8FF| 
| align=left| Thomas Bauer
| align=left| Bürgergemeinschaft Gemeinde Göhl (BGG)
| 1,997
| 69.9
|  6.2
| 8
|  1
|-
| bgcolor=| 
| align=left| Hans Paul Spahrbier
| align=left| Christian Democratic Union of Germany (CDU)
| 858
| 30.1
|  4.5
| 3
| ±0
|-
! colspan=3| Valid votes
! 2,855
! 
!  7.1
! rowspan=2| 11
! rowspan=2| ±0
|-
! colspan=3| Electorate/voter turnout
! 521
! 55.8
!  5.1
|-
| colspan=8| Source: Amt Oldenburg-Land
|}

Coat of Arms and Flag 
The coat of arms and flag of Göhl were created by Henning Höppner, who created multiple insignia in Wagria, and registered with the state of Schleswig-Holstein in 2010. The heather plant in the center is in reference to the origin of the municipality's name, stemming from the Slavic word "Gola" ("heather"). The bottom sections of the shield represent the green land, and the Oldenburger Graben which forms the southern border of the municipality.

The flag of Göhl is a heraldic flag, and shares the same design as the coat of arms.

Culture and associations 
The local sports association, SV Göhl, was founded in 1970 and has around 500 members.

The German Red Cross in Göhl acts as not only a medical service focusing on senior care, but also a cultural association; organizing, among other things, flea markets, game nights, and trips.

In the southernmost settlement of Göhl, Gut Gaarz is a historic estate under family ownership that was built in 1690 and currently acts as a family resort as well as farm.

References 

Municipalities in Schleswig-Holstein
Ostholstein